George Winram (occasionally Windrahame), Lord Liberton MP (1604–1650) was a 17th-century Scottish judge, politician, soldier and Senator of the College of Justice.

Life

He was born in or near Edinburgh the son of James Winram, Keeper of the Signet (d.1632) and his wife, Jean Swinton (d.1635). In 1607 his father purchased the Nether Liberton estate from the heirs of William Little, which included Liberton House (built 1570) and the medieval Inch House, both south of Edinburgh and set about rebuilding Inch House.

George studied law at Edinburgh University graduating MA and passed the Scottish bar as an advocate in 1626. He inherited Liberton house on the death of his father in 1632.

In 1639 he had the unenviable task of delivering the formal papers from the General Assembly of the Church of Scotland regarding their ban on Episcopalianism in Scotland (which they had voted in 1638). This was certainly unpopular as this was the "religion of choice" of the English living in Scotland due to its Anglican views.

From June 1643 to June 1644 he was assistant commissioner to Archibald Johnston, Lord Warriston (his father-in-law). And from June 1644 until March 1647 he was joint MP for Edinburgh alongside Lord Warriston (during the turbulent English Civil War). He served again from March 1648 until his death.

In June 1649 he was elected a Senator of the College of Justice under the title of Lord Liberton.

In the spring of 1650 he was one of the Scots present at the Treaty of Breda.

He met a tragic end. He fought against Cromwell at the Battle of Dunbar on 3 September 1650, leading a regiment as their Colonel, and was mortally wounded on the battlefield. He died of infection eight days later on 11 September 1650.

His estates were confiscated by the State due to his Royalist support and Liberton House was sold to William Little (grandson of his namesake the Lord Provost of Edinburgh who had previously owned the house). From Little it passed to the Gilmour family (in or before 1686) and remained in their ownership until 1945 when the Edinburgh Corporation acquired the house and estate in lieu of debts.

Both Inch House and Liberton House survive.

Family
Around 1629 he married Agnes Hamilton (d.1636). They had two daughters, Catherine and Ann (d.1690). Following Agnes's death he married Janet Johnston, daughter of Archibald Johnston, Lord Warriston. This was Janet's third marriage, and she brought with her 11 children she had borne to James Skene.

Bibliography
Brunton and Haig's Senators of the College of Justice, 1832, pp. 341–2
Balfour's Annales of Scotland, 1825, vols. iii. and iv.
Acts of the Parliaments of Scotland, vol. vi. passim
Letters and Papers illustrating the Relations between Charles II and Scotland in 1650, ed. Gardiner (Scottish Hist. Soc.)
Baillie's Letters and Papers (Bannatyne Club), index
Clarendon State Papers, 1773, vol. ii. App.
Masson's Life of Milton, iv. 180
Carlyle's Works, xv. 198, 230
Foster's Scottish Members of Parliament
Records of the General Assemblies of 1646 and 1647 (Scottish Hist. Soc.), 1892 passim
Hoskins's Charles II in the Channel Islands, 1854, ii. 358–62, 372
Select Biographies (Wodrow Soc.), 1845, i. 169–81
Cal. Clarendon State Papers, ii. 4, 32, 38, 39, 51, 57, 65, 66
Cal. State Papers, Dom. 1650, p. 157

References

Sources

1604 births
1650 deaths
Politicians from Edinburgh
Alumni of the University of Edinburgh
People killed in the English Civil War
Members of the Parliament of Scotland 1644–1647
Senators of the College of Justice
Lawyers from Edinburgh
Military personnel from Edinburgh
Members of the Parliament of Scotland 1648–1651